The Jacobs River, a perennial river of the Snowy River catchment, is located in the Snowy Mountains region of New South Wales, Australia.

Course and features
The Jacobs River rises below Purgatory Hill within The Snowy Mountains Range, part of the Great Dividing Range, contained within the Kosciuszko National Park, on the western slopes of Mount Stony. The river flows generally west and then southeast, joined by five minor tributaries, before reaching its confluence with the Snowy River below Stockyard Ridge. The river descends  over its  course.

See also

 List of rivers of New South Wales (A–K)
 List of rivers of Australia
 Rivers of New South Wales

References

 

Rivers of New South Wales
Snowy Mountains